MKS Ogniwo Sopot is a Polish rugby club based in Sopot.

External links
 MKS Ogniwo Sopot

Polish rugby union teams
Sport in Sopot